Freddie Hogan (born 17 May 1988) is a British actor, who became known to a wider audience in a leading role in the ninth series of the British sitcom Two Pints of Lager and a Packet of Crisps broadcast by BBC Three. Hogan also appears in a minor role in the second part of the movie Harry Potter and the Deathly Hallows.  His theatre performance in Extra Virgin earned him an Off West End Theatre Award nomination for Best Actor. Hogan is filming the new BBC1, 7-part series of Jonathan Strange & Mr Norell as Davey.

Career 
On moving to London Hogan's first role was with The National Youth Theatre in Cymbeline, playing Belarius. The following year he starred in the BBC sitcom Two Pints of Lager and a Packet of Crisps. He also appeared in Harry Potter and The Deathly Hallows part II as one of Harry Potter's house mates in Gryffindor. In the same year he went back to the theatre to play Elliot in Extra Virgin and received his first nomination for an Off West End Award for Best Actor. Hogan has appeared in the series Emmerdale.

Nominations

References 

1988 births
Living people
English male stage actors
English male television actors
National Youth Theatre members